Garça de Cima is a settlement in the northern part of the island of Santo Antão, Cape Verde. It is situated in the upper valley of the river Ribeira da Garça, 15 km northwest of the island capital Porto Novo. The southernmost part lies in Moroços Natural Park.

See also
List of villages and settlements in Cape Verde

References

Villages and settlements in Santo Antão, Cape Verde
Ribeira Grande Municipality